Imaizumi's horseshoe bat (Rhinolophus imaizumii) is a species of bat in the family Rhinolophidae. It is endemic to Japan.  Its natural habitat is temperate forests. While it was formerly considered endangered by the IUCN, it is now considered synonymous with the least horseshoe bat, which is evaluated as least concern.

References

Rhinolophidae
Endemic mammals of Japan
Mammals described in 1980
Bats of Asia
Taxonomy articles created by Polbot
Taxobox binomials not recognized by IUCN